Afon Meillionen (Welsh  for Clover River) is a small river near Beddgelert in Gwynedd, north-west Wales.

It flows down Cwm Meillionen, a small valley which lies on the north-eastern side of Moel yr Ogof (655m).  Much of the river's catchment area lies within Beddgelert Forest.

Afon Meillionen is a tributary of the Afon Colwyn, which itself joins the Afon Glaslyn in the village of Beddgelert.

"Meillionen" is also the name of a farmhouse in the Cwm and of a small halt on the Welsh Highland Railway between Caernarfon and Porthmadog.

Beddgelert
Rivers of Gwynedd
Rivers of Snowdonia